Roces is a neighbourhood of the municipality of Gijón / Xixón, in Asturias, Spain. Its population was 2,858 in 1994 and due to the municipal rezoning, it grew to 7,526 in 2012.

Previously to be integrated in Gijón, Roces was one of the historical parishes of the city.

Neighbourhoods and places
El Barrio la Iglesia
La Braña
Los Caleros
La Fana
El Puentín
Machacón
Montevil
La Nozaleda
La Perdiz
El Recuestu
Valles

References

External links
 Official Toponyms - Principality of Asturias website.
 Official Toponyms: Laws - BOPA Nº 229 - Martes, 3 de octubre de 2006 & DECRETO 105/2006, de 20 de septiembre, por el que se determinan los topónimos oficiales del concejo de Gijón.

Parishes in Gijón